Democratic Republic of the Congo competed at the 2011 World Aquatics Championships in Shanghai, China, July 16–31, 2011.

Swimming

Congo DR qualified 3 swimmers.

Men

Women

References

Nations at the 2011 World Aquatics Championships
2011
World Aquatics Championships